Matthew Ahmat (born 27 June 1974 in Alice Springs) is a former Indigenous Australian rules footballer who played for the Brisbane Bears and Sydney Swans in the Australian Football League (AFL) during the early 1990s.

The Ahmat name has had a long association with the Northern Territory Football League, as both his father and grandfather played at his original club, Darwin. He started his AFL career at Brisbane but struggled to establish a place in the Robert Walls coached side.

After spending the 1993 season in the South Australian National Football League (SANFL) playing for Norwood, Ahmat received a lifeline from Sydney, who recruited him with the first pick of the 1993 Mid-Season draft. Ahmat made appearances in two of the opening three rounds of Sydney's 1994 campaign but could not extend his AFL career any further.

References

1974 births
Living people
Brisbane Bears players
Sydney Swans players
Norwood Football Club players
Indigenous Australian players of Australian rules football
Darwin Football Club players
Australian rules footballers from the Northern Territory